The men's Greco-Roman bantamweight competition at the 1960 Summer Olympics in Rome took place from 26 to 31 August at the Basilica of Maxentius. Nations were limited to one competitor.

Competition format

This Greco-Roman wrestling competition continued to use the "bad points" elimination system introduced at the 1928 Summer Olympics for Greco-Roman and at the 1932 Summer Olympics for freestyle wrestling, though adjusted the point values slightly. Wins by fall continued to be worth 0 points and wins by decision continued to be worth 1 point. Losses by fall, however, were now worth 4 points (up from 3). Losses by decision were worth 3 points (consistent with most prior years, though in some losses by split decision had been worth only 2 points). Ties were now allowed, worth 2 points for each wrestler. The elimination threshold was also increased from 5 points to 6 points. The medal round concept, used in 1952 and 1956 requiring a round-robin amongst the medalists even if one or more finished a round with enough points for elimination, was used only if exactly three wrestlers remained after a round—if two competitors remained, they faced off head-to-head; if only one, he was the gold medalist.

Results

Round 1

Cañete withdrew after his bout. Schlechter was injured and could not continue.

 Bouts

 Points

Round 2

 Bouts

 Points

Round 3

 Bouts

 Points

Round 4

The Official Report shows Vesterby (correctly) at 5 points after round 3, following 2 wins by decision and a loss by decision. After round 4, however, Vesterby is shown at 4 points even though his win by fall should have kept him at 5. There is no explanation for a wrestler receiving a reduction in bad points.

 Bouts

 Points

Round 5

Vesterby's inexplicably reduced point total put him in a tie with Petrov for the bronze medal at 6 points. This tie was broken on head-to-head results; Petrov had defeated Vesterby in round 3. Vesterby would have finished in 4th place even were it not for the point reduction. Švec and Yılmaz were the ones ultimately affected by it, as they would have finished tied with Vesterby for 4th rather than tied only with each other for 5th.

 Bouts

 Points

Round 6

 Bouts

 Points

References

Wrestling at the 1960 Summer Olympics